The Northeast Ohio Master of Fine Arts Program (NEOMFA) is a three-year graduate level consortial creative writing program located in Northeast Ohio. The NEOMFA has a unique collaborative design in which students attend all four universities in the consortium: Cleveland State University, The University of Akron, Kent State University, and Youngstown State University. Writer Imad Rahman is current director of the program.  Students are able to take classes at any of the four campuses, while being part of one unified writing program. The NEOFMA offers courses in poetry, fiction, creative non-fiction, playwriting, and literary translation. 

Since its inception in 2005, the NEOMFA has offered small-group workshops, open readings, summer travel fellowships, and high-profile visiting writers in addition to career-preparing internships and competitive graduate funding. Students have the opportunity to intern with literary presses at all four universities, in theater at the Cleveland Public Theater, and in arts management through outreach programs.

Sources

 Poets & Writers on MFA Programs
 AWP Official Guide to Writing Programs
 Buchtel College of Arts and Sciences at The University of Akron
 Department of English at Kent State University
 College of Liberal Arts and Social Sciences at Cleveland State University
 New Pages Creative Writing Program Listings
 Poets & Writers MFA Programs

Literary journals
 Luna Negra
 Penguin Review
 Rubbertop Review
 Whiskey Island
 YACK

External links 
 NEOMFA Program Website
 Cleveland State English Department
 Kent State English Department
 University of Akron English Department
 Youngstown State English Department
 Wick Poetry Center
 Imagination Conference

Creative writing programs
American writers' organizations
University of Akron
Youngstown State University
Cleveland State University
Kent State University